Fernandinho is a hypocorism of the name Fernando and means "Little Fernando" or "Fernando Jr." in Portuguese.

Fernandinho may refer to:

Footballers 
Fernandinho (footballer, born January 1981), Éldis Fernando Damasio, Brazilian footballer who plays as an attacking midfielder
Fernandinho (footballer, born April 1981), Fernando Alves Santa Clara, Brazilian footballer who plays as a left-back, currently for São Caetano
Fernandinho (footballer, born May 1985), Fernando Luiz Roza, Brazilian footballer who plays as a central midfielder, currently for Athletico Paranaense
Fernandinho (footballer, born August 1985), Fernando Galhardo Borges, Brazilian footballer who plays as a left-back
Fernandinho (footballer, born November 1985), Luiz Fernando Pereira da Silva, Brazilian footballer for Grêmio
Fernandinho (footballer, born 1991), Fernando Barros Bezerra Júnior, Brazilian footballer for Portimonense
Fernandinho (footballer, born March 1993), Fernando Henrique da Conceição, Brazilian footballer
Fernandinho (footballer, born July 1993), Fernando Augusto Rodrigues de Araujo, Brazilian footballer
Fernandinho (footballer, born February 1997), Fernando Camões de Araújo, Portuguese footballer
Fernandinho (footballer, born July 1997), Fernando José Marques Maciel, Brazilian footballer
Fernandinho (footballer, born 2003), Fernando Paiva Correa, Brazilian footballer

Futsal 
Fernandinho (futsal player) (born 1983), Brazilian futsal player who plays as a pivot

See also
Fernandão (nickname)
Fernando

Portuguese masculine given names
Nicknames in association football